Panipat Rural Assembly constituency is one of the 90 constituencies in the Haryana Legislative Assembly of Haryana a northern state of India. It is also part of Karnal (Lok Sabha constituency).

References

Assembly constituencies of Haryana
Karnal district